Pfitz or variant, may refer to:

 Pfitz, a 1999 novel by Andrew Crumey
 The Pfitz, nickname of Pfitzner Stadium, Prince William County, Virignia, USA; a baseball field
 "Pfitz.", a botanical author abbreviation used for Ernst Hugo Heinrich Pfitzer
 Carmen Pfitz (1909-1999), mother of Jaime Zobel de Ayala y Pfitz, and a member of the Zóbel de Ayala family
 Jaime Zobel de Ayala y Pfitz (born 1934) Philippine businessman, and member of the Zóbel de Ayala family
 Larry Pfitz, a fictional character from William Boyd's On the Yankee Station
 Pfitz, a fictional character (not the main character) from the Andrew Crumey novel Pfitz

See also

 Pfitzer (surname)
 
 Fitz (disambiguation)
 Pitz (disambiguation)
 Pfizer (disambiguation)
 Pfitzner (disambiguation)